Germaine Abessolo Bivina (born 9 May 1990) is a Cameroonian sprinter. She won a silver medal in the 4 × 100 metres relay at the 2017 Jeux de la Francophonie and a bronze at the 2017 Islamic Solidarity Games.

International competitions

Personal bests
Outdoor
100 metres – 11.55 (+0.1 m/s, Durban 2016)
200 metres – 23.36(-1.0 m/s, Asaba 2018)

References

1990 births
Living people
Cameroonian female sprinters
Athletes (track and field) at the 2015 African Games
Athletes (track and field) at the 2018 Commonwealth Games
People from South Region (Cameroon)
Competitors at the 2015 Summer Universiade
Competitors at the 2017 Summer Universiade
Commonwealth Games competitors for Cameroon
African Games competitors for Cameroon
Islamic Solidarity Games competitors for Cameroon
20th-century Cameroonian women
21st-century Cameroonian women